Sagter Ems is a river of Lower Saxony, Germany. It is formed at the confluence of the rivers Ohe and Marka west of Friesoythe. At its confluence with the Dreyschloot (a branch of the Soeste), the river Leda is formed. The Sagter Ems is known as the Leda in East Frisia.

See also
List of rivers of Lower Saxony

Rivers of Lower Saxony
Federal waterways in Germany
Rivers of Germany